Hololepta is a genus of clown beetles in the family Histeridae. There are at least 100 described species in Hololepta.

See also
 List of Hololepta species

References

Further reading

 
 
 

Histeridae